Lamprima aurata, the golden stag beetle, is a species of beetle in the family Lucanidae. In Tasmania, this species is referred to by the "common name" of Christmas beetle, a name that is normally used for beetles in the family Scarabaeidae, genus Anoplognathus.

Description

This beetle has an oval, shiny body. It measures between 15 and 25 mm in length. It is fairly variable in coloration, so it has been given many names by various authors. The colour of the males is typically metallic golden green or yellow with colorful legs, while females may be blue, blue-green or dull brown. Females are smaller than the males, and males have larger mandibles prolonged forwards used for fighting.

Distribution and habitat

L. aurata is native to Australia and can be found in Tasmania—mainly Victoria—and south-eastern mainland Australia in dry sclerophyll forests.

Of the five species in the genus Lamprima, only two occur on the Australian mainland: L. aurata and the closely related L. imberbis, which live in northeastern New South Wales.

Biology

The larvae are sapro-xylophagous and will spend two years feeding on rotting logs. Adults are free-flying and will move about on the ground during the day and drink the nectar of flowers, especially eucalypts. Males can be found on rotting logs defending their territory.

Gallery

References

External links
 L. aurata at CSIRO

Beetles of Australia
Beetles described in 1817
Lampriminae